Senate Properties (in , in ) is a Finnish unincorporated state-owned enterprise, which manages a major part of the real estate assets owned by the Republic of Finland.

History
Senate Properties descends from the Office of the Intendant (corresponding names in Finnish and Swedish are listed in the table below), established 3 September 1811, the goal of which was to supervise the planning of government buildings. In 1865, the name was changed to the Board of Public Buildings; and in 1936 to the National Board of Public Building. In 1995, the National Board of Public Building — which was a government agency managing state property — was dissolved. Facility management operations were incorporated into Engel kiinteistöpalveluyhtymä Oy, which was fully privatized in 2004, the buyer being ISS A/S. The majority of the state property assets were transferred into the newly formed State Real Property Agency. The purpose of this agency was to manage the state property which was deemed to be in permanent use.

On 1 January 1999, a heterogeneous collection of government real estate worth 1.3 billion EUR was transferred from various government-owned companies and government agencies — including the State Real Property Agency — and incorporated into Kapiteeli Oy. The transfer consisted of buildings deemed redundant from the government perspective. This included former school buildings, empty government buildings, railway stations fallen into disuse, and other buildings that were considered unnecessary for the government to own, such as post offices and hotels. Part of this property was developed and sold on the market between 1999 and 2006. Kapiteeli was privatized in September 2006. The single buyer, Sponda Oyj, paid 950 million EUR for 100% of Kapiteeli's stock.

Also on 1 January 1999, the State Real Property Agency was transformed from being a government agency into being an unincorporated state-owned enterprise. During the same year, several culturally significant properties were transferred to the State Real Property Agency, including the Ateneum, Kiasma, and the Finnish National Opera Building.

On 1 March 2001, the name of the State Real Property Agency was changed to Senate Properties. The name-change required a change in law because the State Real Property Agency was a state enterprise under Finnish public law, and such entities could not change their name via registration as in the private sector. The purpose with the name-change was to improve the corporate image by having a name reflecting both traditions and modern business philosophy. The new name also refers to the Helsinki Senate Square, where several nearby buildings are managed by Senate Properties.

Legal status
Senate Properties is an unincorporated, fully state-owned enterprise. It is unincorporated in the sense that Senate Properties is not a legal person separate from the State, and compared to incorporated companies, the organization has limited jurisdiction over its activities. Finnish government organizations of this type are governed by the Unincorporated State Enterprise Act of 2002 (Laki Valtion Liikelaitoksista (in Finnish)).

Finance
At the end of 2008, the Finnish government held assets totaling 51.5 billion EUR. Of these assets, 3.8 billion were held in Senate Properties; consisting of 2.6 billion EUR as equity capital, and 1.2 billion as long-term loans. In addition to the equity capital and loans by the Finnish government, Senate Properties had 0.8 billion in retained earnings, and external financing amounting to 1.2 billion from financial institutions. Its balance sheet totaled 5.9 billion at the end of 2008.

Development projects
 Large state office building in Hakaniemi.
 Töölönlahti land areas.

General information
In 2007, Senate Properties was — out of 29 large Finnish companies — recognized as Finland's top reporter of issues related to the environment and to corporate social responsibility.

Gallery of buildings

Notes

References

External links

Government-owned companies of Finland
Real estate in Finland
Sörnäinen
1999 establishments in Finland
Companies based in Helsinki
Financial services companies of Finland
Real estate companies established in 1999